The Sri Lankan Under-19 cricket team is the cricket team that represents Sri Lanka in International Under-19 Cricket. It consists of school-aged cricketers.

Sri Lanka's squad was announced on 23 December 2015.

Sri Lanka went on to win the tri series in South Africa by defeating the South African team by a massive 77 runs in 2017.Avishka Fernando was the topscorer of the series with 292 runs Nipuni Ransika was the leading wicket taker with 17 scalps.

Tournament History

U-19 World Cup Record

U-19 Asia Cup Record

Current squad

References

Under-19 cricket teams
Under-19
C